Rúnar Þór Sigurgeirsson (born 28 December 1999) is an Icelandic footballer who plays as a left-back for Keflavík and the Iceland national team.

Career
Rúnar Þór Sigurgeirsson made his international debut for Iceland on 29 May 2021 in a friendly match against Mexico in Arlington, Texas.

Career statistics

International

References

External links
 
 

1999 births
Living people
Runar Thor Sigurgeirsson
Runar Thor Sigurgeirsson
Association football fullbacks
Runar Thor Sigurgeirsson
Runar Thor Sigurgeirsson
Runar Thor Sigurgeirsson